William Ord (c. 1715 – 24 January 1768) was an English land and mine owner.

Life
He was the second son of Thomas Ord of Fenham and Anne Bacon and inherited the family estates at Fenham and Newminster Abbey on the death of his elder brother John, in 1745.

Ord was High Sheriff of Northumberland in 1747, and in that year received the Freedom of the City of Newcastle-upon-Tyne.

In 1750 he bought the ancient Manor and estate at Whitfield, Northumberland, from the financially pressed Whitfield family. He developed lead and silver mining at Whitfield and coal mining at Benwell (which estate he bought in 1756) and at Fenham.

Family
In 1746 Ord married Anne Dillingham, heiress to estates at West Langton and East Langton, Leicestershire.

His eldest son, William (1752–1789), High Sheriff of Northumberland in 1777, married Eleanor Brandling of Gosforth, daughter of the Member of Parliament Charles Brandling, and William Ord MP was their son; on her husband's death she remarried Thomas Creevey.<ref>{{cite web|url=http://www.historyofparliamentonline.org/volume/1790-1820/member/ord-william-1781-1855|title=Ord, William (1781–1855), of Whitfield Hall, Northumb., History of Parliament Online|accessdate=29 April 2015}}</ref> His second son, Rev. James Ord (1761–1836), who inherited the Langton estates, married Barbara Brandling of Gosforth.

References
John Hodgson, A History of Northumberland (1840) Pt 2 Vol 3
James Raine, Pedigree of Ord of Fenham, Newminster Abbey and Whitfield, p. 107 in History and Antiquities of North Durham'' (1852)

Notes

1710s births
1768 deaths
Members of the Parliament of Great Britain for Bossiney
British MPs 1747–1754
High Sheriffs of Northumberland